Beauty Was a Tiger is the debut solo album by Australian singer Sarah McLeod. It was released in September 2005 by Festival Mushroom Records and peaked at number 31 on the ARIA Charts.

Background and release
From 1994-2004, McLeod was the lead singer of rock group The Superjesus. The group released three top twenty studio albums and won two ARIA Awards. On 18 April 2005, it was announced McLeod had signed with Festival Mushroom Records to release her debut solo studio album. The deal reunited McLeod with Festival Mushroom Records managing director Michael Parisi who had signed The Superjesus to Warner Music Australia a decade earlier when he was A&R Director for Warner. Parisi said "She has made a classy rock album and, above all else, there aren't many ladies of rock left in this world, let alone Australia. We're all chomping at the bit to get this album out there."

The album was released in September 2005.

Reception
Erik Jensen from The Sydney Morning Herald said "it's an album that veers between Australian pub fare and neo-Gothic rock'n'roll, like mixing Dallas Crane with Brisbane fem-rockers Gazoonga Attack. McLeod's voice is strong and raw and makes "Private School Kid" the album standout."

Track listing

Charts

References

2005 debut albums
Sarah McLeod (musician) albums
Mushroom Records albums